The Battle of Barrington was an intense and deadly gunfight between federal agents and notorious Great Depression Era outlaw Baby Face Nelson, that took place on November 27, 1934 in Northside Park, in the town of Barrington, outside Chicago, Illinois. It resulted in the deaths of Nelson,     Federal Agent Herman "Ed" Hollis and Agent/Inspector Samuel P. Cowley.

Public Enemy Number One 

With the death of "Public Enemy Number One" John Dillinger in July 1934, the Federal Bureau of Investigation, known at the time as the Division of Investigation, focused on eliminating what remained of the notorious Dillinger Gang.
Lester "Baby Face Nelson" Gillis, whom newspapers of the era dubbed "Dillinger's aid", had managed to elude the federal dragnet. By late November 1934, the new Public Enemy Number One was looking to hide out in the isolated piney woods of Lake Geneva, Wisconsin.

Gunfight on Highway 12 

On the afternoon of November 27, Nelson, sporting a thin mustache on his youthful face, Helen Gillis (Nelson's wife), and John Paul Chase, Nelson's right-hand man, departed Lake Geneva and traveled south, toward Chicago, on U.S. Route 12 (now U.S. 14). Nelson had spotted one of three federal agents staking out Lake Geneva’s Lake Como Inn, the outlaws’ anticipated hide out.

Near the village of Fox River Grove, Illinois, Nelson observed a vehicle driven in the opposite direction. Inside the car were federal agents Thomas M. McDade and William C. "Bill" Ryan, Sr. (September 10, 1904 – January 25, 1967). McDade and Ryan were traveling to Lake Geneva to support the fellow agents who had reported an encounter with Nelson. The agents and the gangster recognized each other simultaneously and after several U-turns by both cars, Nelson wound up in pursuit of the federal agents.

As Nelson's powerful V-8 Ford caught up to the slower federal sedan, Chase opened fire on the agents. Neither McDade nor Ryan were injured. The agents returned fire, sped ahead and ran off the highway. Taking defensive positions, McDade and Ryan awaited Nelson and Chase. However, the agents were unaware that a round fired by Ryan had punctured the water pump and/or the radiator of Nelson's Ford. With his vehicle losing power, Nelson was next pursued by a Hudson automobile driven by two more agents, Herman Hollis and Samuel P. Cowley.

Battle with Hollis and Cowley 

With his new pursuers attempting to pull alongside, Nelson swung the Ford into the entrance of Barrington's Northside Park, just across the line from Fox River Grove, and skidded to a stop. With their car stopped at an angle, Hollis and Cowley exited, took defensive positions behind the vehicle and, as Helen Gillis took cover in a field, opened fire on Nelson and Chase.

A round from Cowley's Thompson submachine-gun struck Nelson above his belt line. Chase in the meantime, continued to fire from behind the car. After Nelson switched his jammed machine-gun for another, he stepped into the line of fire and advanced toward Cowley and Hollis. Cowley was hit by a burst from Nelson's gun after retreating to a nearby ditch. Pellets from Hollis' shotgun struck Nelson in the legs.
Hollis, possibly already wounded, retreated behind a utility pole. With his shotgun empty, Hollis drew his service pistol only to be struck by a bullet to the head from Nelson's gun. Hollis slid against the pole and fell face down. Nelson stood over Hollis then limped toward the agents' bullet-riddled car. Nelson backed the agents' car over to the Ford, and, with Chase's help, loaded the agents' vehicle with guns and ammo from the disabled Ford. After the weapons transfer, Nelson, too badly wounded to drive, collapsed into the Hudson. Chase got behind the wheel and, along with Gillis and the mortally wounded Nelson, fled the scene.

Nelson had been shot a total of nine times; a single (and ultimately fatal) machine gun slug had struck his abdomen and eight of Hollis's shotgun pellets had hit his legs. After telling his wife "I'm done for", Nelson gave directions as Chase drove them to a safe house on Walnut Street in Wilmette. Nelson died in bed there, with his wife at his side, at 7:35 that evening.
Hollis, with massive head wounds, was declared dead soon after arriving at the hospital. At a different hospital, Cowley hung on long enough to confer briefly with Melvin Purvis, telling him, "Nothing would bring [Nelson] down." He underwent unsuccessful surgery before succumbing to a stomach wound similar to Nelson's.

Following an anonymous telephone tip, Nelson's body was discovered wrapped in a Native American patterned blanket in front of St. Paul's Lutheran Cemetery in Skokie, which still exists today. Helen Gillis later stated that she had placed the blanket around Nelson's body because, "He always hated being cold."

Fate of Helen Gillis and John Paul Chase 

Newspapers reported, based on the questionable wording of an order from J. Edgar Hoover ("...find the woman and give her no quarter"), that the Bureau of Investigation had issued a "death order" for Nelson's widow. She wandered the streets of Chicago as a fugitive for several days, described in print as America's first female "public enemy". After surrendering on Thanksgiving Day, Gillis, who had been paroled after capture at Little Bohemia Lodge, served a year in prison for harboring her late husband and died in 1987. Chase was apprehended later and served a term at Alcatraz and died in 1973.

References

Further reading
 Eyewitness, then 6 years old, recounts the event 81 years later. Includes video.

Barrington, Illinois
Organized crime history of Chicago
+Battle
Crimes in Chicago
Law enforcement operations in the United States
1934 in Illinois